Mecyna suffusalis is a moth in the family Crambidae. It was described by Warren in 1892. It is found in Japan.

The wingspan is 26–27 mm.

References

Moths described in 1892
Spilomelinae